This article contains lists of named passenger trains in Japan.

Shinkansen (bullet trains)

Daytime trains

Limited express (partial list)

Express

Rapid

Night trains

Limited express

Express

Rapid

See also
 Rail transport in Japan

References

 JR Timetable, December 2008
 
 

 List of named passenger trains of Japan
Japan
Named passenger trains